Amenan Joëlle Rosemonde Kouassi (born 26 December 2001), known as Rosemonde Kouassi, is an Ivorian footballer who plays as a forward for French Division 1 Féminine club FC Fleury 91 and the Ivory Coast women's national team.

International career
Kouassi capped for Ivory Coast at senior level during the 2020 CAF Women's Olympic Qualifying Tournament.

See also
List of Ivory Coast women's international footballers

References

2001 births
Living people
Women's association football forwards
Ivorian women's footballers
Ivory Coast women's international footballers
Ivorian expatriate footballers
Ivorian expatriate sportspeople in Israel
Expatriate women's footballers in Israel